The Collectable Few are a former British Indie/Alternative band from West London, active between 2007–2012. They released five singles and two full-length albums. The band consisted of Tarek Al-Shammaa on lead vocals and synths, Tom Christensen on bass guitar and backing vocals, Nat Cantor on guitars, piano and synths, and Alex Hammond on drums, percussion and backing vocals.

History
Initially formed in 2006, the band began rehearsing in Shepherds Bush, sharing the same studio space as fellow London band The Mystery Jets. They played their first gig at The Enterprise, Camden towards the end of the year.

By 2009, The Collectable Few had built a strong London following thanks to relentless gigging across the capital. In March, the band signed their first record deal with prestigious XL Recordings' imprint Salvia. The song "Missing Out" was released on the label on 9 August 2009.
Towards the end of the year they began a transatlantic working relationship with New York-based, Grammy award-winning mixer/producer Andrew Maury, known for his work with Lizzo, Shawn Mendes, Lewis Del Mar, Ra Ra Riot and Remix Artist Collective (RAC).

In October 2010, they signed to the London-based Laissez Faire Club label. Their first single on the label was "Headstrong" released on 24 January 2011. The B-side featured an RAC remix of the title track, also mixed by Andrew Maury. "Headstrong" gained the band further recognition, getting regular airplay on XFM, BBC Radio 1 and BBC 6 Music. The Collectable Few continued to tour heavily in 2011, playing shows alongside notable acts including Eliza Doolittle, Bastille, Anna Calvi, Bombay Bicycle Club, The Whigs (band), The Maccabees, Katy Perry, We Have Band and The Big Pink. The band released follow up single "Model Behaviour"  later that year, which featured a music video starring model and actress Zoe Lister. They also featured as Replay's 'Road Trip to Bestival' band to watch that summer.

The Collectable Few started the first half of 2012 touring across the UK and Europe, including joint headline dates with Dog Is Dead and Let's Buy Happiness. In June they travelled to the United States to record their debut album with now longstanding collaborator Andrew Maury. Pre-production sessions took place in Brooklyn at Rubber Tracks studio. The album was then recorded and mixed between early June and mid-July at Black Dog studio in Upstate New York. After completing their "Vancouver" LP (later released under the name Diaz), the band played a handful of US dates, which included the renowned Bowery Ballroom in New York City, playing many of the album's tracks live for the first time.

The Collectable Few's final appearances were at The Queen of Hoxton with Tribes (band) and Chapel Club, and two sold out nights at the Borderline on 11th and 12th December, 2012. However, they briefly resurfaced in the summer of 2013 to play the Hoxton Square Bar & Kitchen and Carnaby Sound Festival under the name Diaz.

The Collectable Few's second full-length album named "Retrospective"  was released on 17 January 2016, featuring unreleased tracks and singles spanning the band's career.

Alex Hammond is now drumming for Pias Recordings' artist Ten Fé, while Tom and Nat went on to play in Karima Francis's live/touring band.

TV, film & fashion
The band's music has been featured in TV, film and fashion. "Headstrong" was used in an official promotional film for then world heavyweight boxing champion Wladimir Klitschko in 2013. It was also selected for Fendi's spring/summer '18 fashion commercial, Topshop's 2012 global in-store playlist, and feature film The Knot starring Mena Suvari and Talulah Riley. Their song "Glamour" served as the theme song for Channel 4's emerging music show: Curated By Scott and Lyle. And in September 2011 the band were invited to play the opening of California fashion brand Patagonia (clothing)'s London flagship store in Covent Garden.

Discography
"Missing Out" (2009), Salvia/XL Recordings
"Half The Night" (2010), Wave Machine/ Universal Music Group (distribution)
"Headstrong" (2011), Laissez Faire Club
"Model Behaviour" (2011), Wave Machine/ Universal Music Group (distribution)
"Glamour" (2012), Wave Machine/ Universal Music Group (distribution)

Albums
"Vancouver" (2014) (released under the name of Diaz), Wave Machine
"Retrospective" (2016), Wave Machine/ Laissez Faire Club/ Salvia/XL Recordings/ Universal Music Group (distribution)

References

External links 
 The Collectable Few Model Behaviour single review from Faux magazine  http://ireadfaux.com/2011/11/the-collectable-few-model-behaviour/
 The Collectable Few Model Behaviour single review for Beat Wolf official http://beatwulf.com/artists/collectable-model-behaviour/
 Ross Clements on The Collectable Few playing Belgium from The Word Magazine  http://dev.thewordmagazine.com/music/ross-clements-and-geert-sermon/
 Record signing from Laissez Faire Club Records official  http://laissezfaireclub.com/2010/10/lfc002-the-collectable-few-headstrong/

2007 establishments in England
2012 disestablishments in England
British alternative rock groups